Emily Blatchley (c. 1842 – 26 July 1874) was a British Protestant Christian missionary to China with the China Inland Mission. She pioneered the work of single women missionaries in China and served as personal secretary to the founder of the mission, James Hudson Taylor.

Biographical sketch

Blatchley lost her mother and father before her experience as a missionary.  She was an 1865 graduate of the Home and Colonial Training College along with her friend, Jane Elizabeth Faulding. The Taylor family unofficially adopted her as one of their own and her attendance at the weekly prayer meeting for China at Coborn Street in Bromley-by-Bow, East End of London (as well as Taylor's book "China's Spiritual Need and Claims") soon led to her volunteering to join the largest party of Protestant missionaries to ever yet set sail for China, the Lammermuir Party, in 1866.

In China, she dressed in Chinese clothes along with the rest of the new C.I.M. missionaries, including all of the single women.  Blatchley was a governess for the Taylor children: Grace Dyer Taylor, Herbert Hudson Taylor, Frederick Howard Taylor, and Samuel Dyer Taylor. She taught them daily lessons and freed Maria Taylor to participate in more missionary work with her husband. She was also the "right hand secretary" of the mission and took charge of much of the correspondence with William Thomas Berger at the home headquarters in England.

Blatchley traveled with the Taylors as a fellow pioneer missionary and survived the Yangzhou riot in 1868. She struggled with tuberculosis throughout the last period of her life.  In 1870, at the request of Hudson and Maria Taylor, she chaperoned the Taylor children back to England for their own health and safety. She also assumed many responsibilities of an acting home-director (a "guardian secretary") in England of the China Inland Mission while Taylor was still in China.

After the death of Maria Taylor (from tuberculosis) she once privately hoped that Taylor would seek her hand in marriage. However, her health finally deteriorated and she died of the same illness as her friend in 1874.

She died on Sunday morning July 26, 1874, and was buried in the eastern side of Highgate Cemetery on one of the narrower north/south paths. The inscription on her grave (plot no.20165) has now completely worn away.

Quotations

Quotation about her life

From: Hudson Taylor and the China Inland Mission, Growth of a Work of God: A Quote from The Christian eulogizing Blatchley:

Quotation after two typhoons
After the Lammermuir party survived two typhoons she noted:

References

Notes

Further reading 
Historical Bibliography of the China Inland Mission

External links
Christian Biography Resources
OMF International (formerly China Inland Mission and Overseas Missionary Fellowship)
https://web.archive.org/web/20070926212919/http://www.genealogy.com/users/y/o/r/Brian-York-Burnsville/?Welcome=1091209026

1840s births
1874 deaths
Baptist missionaries in China
British expatriates in China
English Baptist missionaries
Burials at Highgate Cemetery
Female Christian missionaries
English domestic workers
Alumni of the Home and Colonial Training College
19th-century Baptists